Vaudreuil-Soulanges may refer to:
 Vaudreuil-Soulanges Regional County Municipality, Quebec
 Vaudreuil—Soulanges, a federal electoral district coterminal with the aforementioned Regional County Municipality
 Vaudreuil-Soulanges (provincial electoral district), a former provincial electoral district in Quebec